2023 in Bellator MMA is the fifteenth year in the history of Bellator MMA, a mixed martial arts promotion based in the United States.

Events list

Scheduled events

Past events

Bellator Lightweight World Grand Prix Tournament
On September 28, 2022, Bellator president Scott Coker revealed in a The MMA Hour interview that a Lightweight World Grand Prix will take place in 2023. On January 11, 2023, during an appearance on "The MMA Hour," Bellator president Scott Coker revealed the fighters taking part in the tournament. The lineup includes Usman Nurmagomedov, A.J. McKee, Tofiq Musayev, Alexandr Shabliy, Patricky Freire, Mansour Barnaoui, Benson Henderson, and Sidney Outlaw. The tournament is set to kick off at Bellator 292 on March 10 in San Jose, California.

Bellator Bantamweight World Grand Prix Tournament

Title fights

See also 
 List of Bellator events
 List of current Bellator fighters
 Bellator MMA Rankings
 2023 in combat sports
 2023 in UFC
 2023 in ONE Championship
 2023 in Absolute Championship Akhmat
 2023 in Konfrontacja Sztuk Walki
 2023 in Rizin Fighting Federation
 2023 in AMC Fight Nights
 2023 in Brave Combat Federation
 2023 in Road FC
 2023 Professional Fighters League season
 2023 in Eagle Fighting Championship

References

External links
Bellator

2023 in mixed martial arts
Bellator MMA events
Scheduled mixed martial arts events